The history of Germany from 1990 to the present spans the period following the German reunification, when West Germany and East Germany were reunited after being divided during the Cold War. Germany after 1990 is referred to by historians as the Berlin Republic (Berliner Republik). This time period is also determined by the ongoing process of the "inner reunification" of the formerly divided country.

Economics

Stagnation in 1990s

Germany invested over two trillion marks in the rehabilitation of the former East Germany, helping it to transition to a market economy and cleaning up the environmental degradation. By 2011 the results were mixed, with slow economic development in the East,  in sharp contrast to the rapid economic growth in both west and southern Germany.  Unemployment was much higher in the East, often over 15%. Economists Snower and Merkl (2006) suggest that the malaise was prolonged by all the social and economic help from the German government, pointing especially to bargaining by proxy, high unemployment benefits and welfare entitlements, and generous job-security provisions.

The German economic miracle petered out in the 1990s, so that by the end of the century and the early 2000s it was ridiculed as "the sick man of Europe."  It suffered a short recession in 2003. The economic growth rate was a very low 1.2% annually from 1988 to 2005. Unemployment, especially in the eastern districts, remained stubbornly high despite heavy stimulus spending. It rose from 9.2% in 1998 to 11.1% in 2009. The worldwide Great Recession of 2008-2010 worsened conditions briefly, as there was a sharp decline in GDP. However unemployment did not rise, and recovery was faster than almost anywhere else. The old industrial centers of the Rhineland and North Germany lagged as well, as the coal and steel industries faded in importance.

Resurgence after 2010
The economic policies were heavily oriented toward the world market, and the export sector continued to be very strong.  Prosperity was pulled along by exports that reached a record of $1.7 trillion US dollars in 2011, or half of the German GDP, or nearly 8% of all of the exports in the world. While the rest of the European Community struggled with financial issues, Germany took a conservative position based on an extraordinarily strong economy after 2010. The labor market proved flexible, and the export industries were attuned to world demand.

Chancellorship of Helmut Kohl in a reunited Germany (1990–1998)

Five new states 

On October 3, 1990, the German Democratic Republic was dissolved, five states were recreated (Brandenburg, Mecklenburg-Vorpommern, Saxony, Saxony-Anhalt and Thuringia) and the new states became part of the Federal Republic of Germany, an event known as the German Reunification.

Elections for new state parliaments were held in the five states on October 14, and the Christian Democratic Union of Germany became the largest party in all states except Brandenburg, where the Social Democratic Party of Germany became the largest party.

The reunified Berlin became the capital of Germany on October 3, although the government continued to have its seat in Bonn until 1999. December 2 marks the first elections for the city parliament after reunification.

Kohl's fourth term, 1991–1994 
The first federal election after reunification, the 1990 federal election, took place on December 2 in that year. The CDU became the largest party with 43.8%, followed by the SPD (33.5%) and the Free Democratic Party of Germany (11%).

On June 20, 1991, the Bundestag decided that the parliament and parts of the government and central administration would be relocated from Bonn to the capital, Berlin. At this time, the term "Berlin Republic" (alluding to the Cold War era "Bonn Republic" and the interwar period "Weimar Republic") emerged.

Roman Herzog, a former Judge at the Federal Constitutional Court of Germany, was elected President of Germany in 1994, succeeding Richard von Weizsäcker.

Kohl's fifth term, 1994–1998  
Following the 1994 federal election, Helmut Kohl was reelected as Chancellor for his fifth and last term.

Chancellorship of Gerhard Schröder (1998–2005)

First term, 1998–2002
The ruling liberal-conservative coalition government, consisting of the CDU/CSU and the FDP, lost the 1998 federal election, and Gerhard Schröder was elected as Chancellor, the head of a coalition government consisting of his own SPD party and The Greens. Joschka Fischer, a leading Green politician, became Vice Chancellor and Foreign Minister.

Shortly after the formation of the government, Minister of Finance Oskar Lafontaine, a former SPD chairman and rival of Schröder, resigned from the cabinet. He was succeeded as Minister of Finance by Hans Eichel.

In 1998, it became known that the CDU/CSU had received anonymous funding. Helmut Kohl subsequently resigned as honorary party chairman, and in 2000, Wolfgang Schäuble resigned as party chairman. Angela Merkel, the Secretary General of the CDU since 1998, emerged as a leading figure in the party and was elected chairwoman in 2000.

In 1999, Johannes Rau was elected President of Germany. Rau had tried to be elected president for several years.

A large tax reform was implemented in 2000. After 2003, the federal government enacted a number of reforms in social and health policy, known as Agenda 2010. The Schröder government also stressed environmental issues and promoted the reduction of greenhouse gas.

Germany took part in the NATO war against Yugoslavia in 1999, when German forces saw combat for the first time since World War II. Chancellor Schröder supported the war on terror following the September 11 attacks against the United States, and Germany sent forces to Afghanistan. Germany also sent forces to Kosovo and other parts of the world.

In 1999, Germany partially adopted the Euro, which completely replaced the Deutsche Mark as the currency of Germany in 2002.

Several German cities, notably Dresden and Magdeburg, experienced severe flooding during the 2002 European floods.

Second term, 2002–2005 
In 2002, Edmund Stoiber was the candidate for Chancellor for the CDU/CSU, the first time a CSU politician was chancellor candidate since the candidacy of Franz Josef Strauss in 1980. Both CDU/CSU and the SPD polled 38.5% in the 2002 federal election. Since the Greens became larger than the liberals, Gerhard Schröder's government was reelected.

Germany and France vehemently opposed the 2003 Iraq War, leading the administration of George W. Bush to label Germany and France as the Old Europe, as opposed to the countries (mainly former east bloc countries) that supported the war. However, Germany supported the United States militarily in other parts of the world, notably in the Horn of Africa and Kuwait.

The early 2000s saw increased unemployment and an aging population. The government instituted further reforms to meet these challenges, known as the Hartz reforms. However, as the Bundesrat of Germany had a CDU/CSU majority, the government of Gerhard Schröder was dependent on support from the conservatives in order to pass legislation.

On May 23, 2004, Horst Köhler, the former head of the International Monetary Fund and a CDU politician, was elected President of Germany. Köhler, who was previously relatively unknown in Germany, quickly became one of the country's most popular politicians.

After a bitter defeat for the SPD in state elections in the state of North Rhine-Westphalia (22 May 2005), Chancellor Schröder asked the German Bundestag (lower house of parliament) for a vote of no-confidence. Schröder argued that it had become increasingly difficult to push for the necessary socio-economic reforms because of the opposition majority in the upper house of the parliament, the Bundesrat, as well as the tensions within his own party. After losing this vote, as intended, on July 1, Chancellor Schröder was able to ask President Horst Köhler to call new federal elections. On 21 July 2005 the President agreed to Chancellor's request and dissolved the parliament,  scheduling early parliamentary elections for 18 September.

Chancellorship of Angela Merkel (2005–2021)

First term, 2005–2009 

The 2005 federal election resulted in a stalemate for both major parties, SPD and CDU/CSU, as they won almost the same number of seats, but not enough to form a majority without the support of several smaller parties. This was resolved on November 11, 2005, when both parties agreed to form a grand coalition led by Angela Merkel who became the first female Chancellor of Germany.

Under Merkel, Germany hosted the 2007 G8 summit in Heiligendamm, Mecklenburg.

In January 2009 the German government approved a €50 billion economic stimulus plan to protect several sectors from a downturn and a subsequent rise in unemployment rates.

Second term, 2009–2013 
In the 2009 federal election, the CDU/CSU and the FDP won a majority and Angela Merkel could form a coalition with the liberals, the Cabinet Merkel II. Guido Westerwelle became the new Vice Chancellor.  The Social Democrats did especially poorly in the election.

Among the major German political projects initiated in this term are the energy transition (Energiewende) [In fact, it was the previous government which initiated the exit from nuclear power. This policy was reversed by Merkel before she was forced into a U-turn by Fukushima.] for a sustainable energy supply, the "Debt Brake" (Schuldenbremse) for balanced budgets, the reform of German immigration laws, and high-tech strategies for the informatization and future transition of the German economy, summarized as Industry 4.0.

Third term, 2013–2018 

In December 2013, the grand coalition was re-established in a Third Merkel cabinet.
The FDP Liberals are not present in the Bundestag for the first time. Since 2014, the newly established right-wing populist Alternative for Germany (AfD) party were elected for various Landtag mandates.

Major political projects of the second grand coalition under Merkel are the legislation for a general minimum wage in Germany and various welfare reforms, including pension reforms. Projects initiated with the Liberals in the second term are largely continued.

Germany was affected by the European migrant crisis in 2015 as it became the final destination of choice for many asylum seekers from Africa and the Middle East entering the EU. The country took in over a million refugees and migrants and developed a quota system which redistributed migrants around its federal states based on their tax income and existing population density. The decision by Merkel to authorize unrestricted entry led to heavy criticism in Germany as well as within Europe.

Fourth term, 2018–2021 
In 2017, Angela Merkel was elected to a fourth term as Chancellor. The FDP reentered the Bundestag, and for the first time the right-wing populist AfD also entered in the election. In March 2018, Angela Merkel formed another grand coalition with Social Democrats (SPD) after five months of political deadlock since September's election.

Chancellorship of Olaf Scholz (2021–present) 

On 8 December 2021, Social Democrat Olaf Scholz was sworn in as chancellor. He formed a traffic-light coalition government with the Greens and the FDP after the SPD won a plurality as a result of the 2021 federal election.

Frank-Walter Steinmeier was re-elected for a second five-year term as Germany's president, a first for an SPD president, attributed to his perception as a symbol of consensus and continuity.

Russia's invasion of Ukraine in 2022 and its economic effects dominated Scholz's early foreign and domestic policies. Germany’s previous foreign policy towards Russia (traditional Ostpolitik) was criticized for having been too credulous and soft towards Russia. Scholz's Zeitenwende speech three days after the start of the invasion signaled a foreign policy shift in contemporary Germany, with billions of dollars in investments in the German military. Scholz also approved direct military and economic aid to Ukraine. Amid a global energy crisis, Scholz committed to weaken dependence on Russian energy imports by halting certification of Nord Stream 2 while also committing to Merkel's policy of phasing out nuclear energy.

Notes

References

Further reading
 Ash, Timothy Garton. In Europe's Name: Germany and the Divided Continent (1997), 700pp
 Bolgherini, Silvia. and Florian Grotz, eds. Germany After the Grand Coalition: Governance and Politics in a Turbulent Environment (Palgrave Macmillan; 2011) 231 pages; studies of the "Grand Coalition" of 2005-09 and the first Merkel government.
 Crawford, Alan, and Tony Czuczka. Angela Merkel: A Chancellorship Forged in Crisis (2013)
 Epstein, Catherine. "East Germany and Its History since 1989," Journal of Modern History Vol. 75, No. 3 (September 2003), pp. 634–661 in JSTOR
 Faas, Thorsten. "The German Federal Election of 2013: Merkel’s Triumph, the Disappearance of the Liberal Party, and Yet Another Grand Coalition." West European Politics 38#1 (2015): 238–247.
 Jarausch, Konrad H. The Rush to German Unity (1994), 304pp
 Kornelius, Stefan. Angela Merkel: The Chancellor and Her World (2013)
  Smith, Helmut Walser, ed. The Oxford Handbook of Modern German History (2011),  excerpt pp 753–814

Primary sources
 Jarausch, Konrad H., and Volker Gransow, eds. Uniting Germany: Documents and Debates, 1944-1993 (1994)

 1990
 
 
1990
Germany